The Niger national basketball team represents Niger in international competitions. It is administrated by the Fédération Nigérienne de Basket-Ball (FENIBASKET).

Niger had its best performance at the 1968 African Basketball Championship, when Niger finished 8th after beating Côte d'Ivoire 73–62.

Competitive record

Summer Olympics
yet to qualify

World championships
yet to qualify

FIBA Africa Championship

African Games

yet to qualify

Notable players
Current notable players from Niger:

|}

Legend
Club – describes current club 
Age – describes age on 15 May 2017
|}

See also
 Niger women's national basketball team
 Niger national under-19 basketball team
 Niger national under-17 basketball team
 Niger national 3x3 team

External links
Niger Basketball Records at FIBA Archive
Official Website

References

Men's national basketball teams
Basketball
Basketball in Niger
1963 establishments in Niger